Haliplus cribrarius is a species in the family Haliplidae ("crawling water beetles"), in the order Coleoptera ("beetles").

References

Further reading
 American Beetles, Volume I: Archostemata, Myxophaga, Adephaga, Polyphaga: Staphyliniformia, Arnett, R.H. Jr., and M. C. Thomas. (eds.). 2000. CRC Press LLC, Boca Raton, FL.
 
 Peterson Field Guides: Beetles, Richard E. White. 1983. Houghton Mifflin Company.

Haliplidae